A number of organizations, museums and monuments are intended to serve as memorials to the Holocaust, the Nazi Final Solution, and its millions of victims.

Memorials and museums listed by country:

A - D: AlbaniaArgentinaAustraliaAustriaBelarusBelgiumBrazilBulgariaCanadaChina (PRC)CroatiaCubaCzech Republic
E - J: Ecuador  Estonia  FranceGermanyGreeceHungaryIsraelItalyJapan 
K - O: 
LatviaLithuaniaMexicoNetherlandsNew ZealandNorth MacedoniaNorway 
P - T: 
PhilippinesPoland
Portugal
RomaniaRussiaSerbiaSlovakiaSloveniaSouth AfricaSpainSurinameSwedenTaiwan
U - Z: 
UkraineUnited KingdomUnited StatesUruguay
Other sections:
See alsoNotesReferencesFurther readingExternal links

Albania

 Holocaust memorial, with inscription written in three stone plaques in English, Hebrew, and Albanian: “Albanians, Christians, and Muslims endangered their lives to protect and save the Jews.” (Tirana)

Argentina
 The Holocaust Museum of Buenos Aires (Buenos Aires)
 National Memorial to the Victims of the Holocaust (Plaza de la Shoá, Buenos Aires)

Australia
Adelaide Holocaust Museum and Andrew Steiner Education Centre (Adelaide, South Australia)
 The Jewish Holocaust Centre (Melbourne, Victoria)
 Leo Baeck Centre for Progressive Judaism (Kew, Victoria) Holocaust Memorial
 Melbourne General Cemetery Holocaust Memorial (Parkville, Victoria)
 Sydney Jewish Museum (Sydney)
Magen Shoah, The Central Synagogue (Sydney)

Austria

 The Judenplatz Holocaust Memorial (Vienna)
Holocaust and Tolerance Center Styria, "House of Names" (Holocaust und Toleranzzentrum Steiermark, Haus der Namen) (Graz)
House of Responsibility (Braunau am Inn)
Mauthausen Concentration Camp Memorial (Mauthausen)
Learning and memorial site Charlotte Taitl House (Ried im Innkreis)
Memorial against war and fascism (Vienna)
Pogrom Monument
Memorial to the Jews of Zelem
Memorial Site Hartheim Castle (Alkoven)

Belarus
 The Pit, Minsk

Belgium
 Kazerne Dossin: Memorial, Museum and Documentation Centre on Holocaust and Human Rights (Mechelen)
 National Monument to the Jewish Martyrs of Belgium (Brussels)

Brazil
 Holocaust victims memorial at Rio de Janeiro – Cemitério Israelita do Caju (sephardic) – inaugurated in September 1975
 Holocaust victims memorial at Salvador – Cemitério Israelita da Bahia – inaugurated in 2007
 Holocaust Museum in Curitiba – inaugurated in 2011 (Paraná)
 Memorial of Jewish Immigration and of the Holocaust, São Paulo – 2011

Bulgaria
 Jewish Historical Museum (Sofia)
 Dimitar Peshev Museum (Kyustendil)
 Monument of Gratitude (Plovdiv)

Canada

 Holocaust Memorial sculpture (Edmonton, Alberta)
 Sarah and Chaim Neuberger Holocaust Education Centre (Toronto)
 The Vancouver Holocaust Education Centre (Vancouver, British Columbia)
 Montreal Holocaust Museum
 Ottawa National Holocaust Monument

China (People's Republic of China)
 Hong Kong Holocaust and Tolerance Centre (Hong Kong)
 Shanghai Jewish Refugees Museum 
 "Wall of Shanghai List" and Holocaust Memorial statue (Shanghai)

Croatia
 The Jasenovac Memorial Area (Jasenovac)
 Memorial Centre Lipa Remembers (Lipa, Matulji)

Cuba
 Holocaust Memorial Santa Clara
 Sephardic Center Holocaust Exhibit (Havana)

Czech Republic

 Holocaust memorial (Valašské Meziříčí)
 Pinkas Synagogue/Old Jewish Cemetery (Prague)
 Old New Synagogue (Prague)
 Theresienstadt concentration camp (Terezín)
The Memorial to the Holocaust of the Roma and Sinti in Moravia (Hodonín u Kunštátu)
The Memorial to the Holocaust of the Roma and Sinti in Bohemia (Lety u Písku)

Ecuador
 Casa Museo Trude Sojka (in memory of a Holocaust survivor and artist)

Estonia

 Holocaust memorial at the site of Klooga concentration camp (Klooga)
 Memorial at the site of Kalevi-Liiva (Jägala)

France

 Maison d'Izieu mémorial des enfants juifs exterminés, Izieu
 Centre de la mémoire d'Oradour, Oradour-sur-Glane
 Holocaust museum at Drancy internment camp (Mémorial de la Shoah de Drancy)
 Center of Contemporary Jewish Documentation (Paris)
 Mémorial de la Shoah (Paris)
 Mémorial des Martyrs de la Déportation (Paris)
 Memorial to the patients of the Clermont psychiatric ward
 Memorial at Gurs internment camp
 Royallieu-Compiègne internment camp memorial
 Camp des Milles memorial (Aix-en-Provence)
 Vélodrome d’Hiver memorial (Paris)
 Memorial Museum to the Children of Vel d'Hiv (Orléans)
 European Centre of Deported Resistance Members and Struthof Museum at the former Natzweiler-Struthof concentration camp

Germany

 Jewish Museum Berlin
 Memorial to the Murdered Jews of Europe (Berlin) 
 Memorial to the Homosexuals Persecuted under the National Socialist Regime (Berlin)
 Memorial to the Sinti and Roma Victims of National Socialism (Berlin)
  (Soest) 
 Memorial to the Victims of National Socialist 'Euthanasia' Killings (German: Gedenk- und Informationsort für die Opfer der nationalsozialistischen »Euthanasie«-Morde)
 Stolperstein – Holocaust memorials all over Germany and in 21 further European countries
 Topf & Söhne – Builders of the Auschwitz Ovens. Museum and Place of Remembrance (Erfurt)
 European Holocaust Memorial (Landsberg am Lech)
Dachau Concentration Camp Memorial Site
Nordenstadt Memorial
Wollheim Memorial
Eckerwald Memorial
KZ-Transport 1945 Memorial
Angel of Peace (Mannheim)
Freight Wagon Memorial
Forced Laborer Memorial Transit, Nuremberg
European Holocaust Memorial in Landsberg
Memorial Neuer Börneplatz
Concentration Camp Memorial Hailfingen-Tailfingen
Documentation Centre NS Forced Labor
Memorial in memory of the burning of books, Berlin
Memorial at the Frankfurt Grossmarkthalle
Jewish Cemetery (Anklam)
"Dejudaization Institute" Memorial (Eisenach)
Memorial to the murdered Jews of Hanover

Greece

 The Athens Holocaust Memorial, outside the archaeological site of Kerameikos (Athens) 
 Cemetery and Monument for the Victims of the Holocaust – 3rd Cemetery of Athens, Nikea (Piraeus)
 Monument to Young Jews (in memory of young Jews murdered in the Holocaust) – Pafos Square, Athens
 Jewish Museum of Greece – Shoah Exhibit (Athens)
 Jewish Museum of Thessaloniki – Shoah Exhibit (Thessaloniki, Central Macedonia)
 Holocaust Museum of Greece, Thessaloniki (under construction)
 Monument of the Victims of the Holocaust in the Jewish Martyrs square (Rhodes)
 Rhodes Jewish Museum
 Holocaust Memorial of Corfu (New Fortress Square, Corfu)

Hungary
 Holocaust Memorial Center, Budapest 
 Dohány Street Synagogue, Budapest
 Shoes on the Danube Bank, Budapest
 Emanuel Tree in Dohány Street Synagogue, Budapest

Indonesia
 Indonesia Holocaust Museum, (Tondano)

Israel

 Yad Vashem, the Holocaust Martyrs' and Heroes' Remembrance Authority (Jerusalem)
 Beit Terezin (in Kibbutz Givat Haim (Ihud))
 Ghetto Fighters' House (Kibbutz Lohamei HaGeta'ot)
 Massuah Institute for the Study of the Holocaust (Kibbutz Tel Yitzhak)
 From Holocaust to Revival Museum (Kibbutz Yad Mordechai)
 Kiryat Białystok Archive and Community Center (Yehud)
 Chamber of the Holocaust (Mount Zion, Jerusalem)
  Ani Ma'amin Holocaust Museum (Jerusalem)
 Forest of the Martyrs (Jerusalem)
 LGBT Memorial to LGBT people persecuted by the Nazis (Tel Aviv)
 The sculpture garden of Holocaust to resurrection (Karmiel)
 Memorial to the Deportation of Jews from France
 Monument to the children in Yad Vashem (Jerusalem)
 Holocaust and Revival Memorial Sculpture, by Igael Tumarkin (Rabin Square, Tel Aviv)
 Anne Frank Children's Human Rights Memorial, Maaleh Adumim

Italy
 Memoriale della Shoah (Milan)
 Museo della Deportazione (Prato)
 Fondazione Museo della Shoah (Rome)
 Museo Diffuso della Resistenza Torino (Torino)
 Museum of Italian Judaism and the Shoah (Ferrara)
 Museo della Deportazione
 Great Synagogue of Rome (Rome)
 Museo Ebraico di Roma (Rome)

Japan
 Holocaust Education Center (Fukuyuma)
 Tokyo Holocaust Education Resource Center (Tokyo)
 Anne's Rose Church (Nishinomiya, Hyogo)
 Port of Humanity Tsuruga Museum (Tsuruga, Fukui)
 Chiune Sugihara Memorial Hall
 Auschwitz Peace Museum (Shirakawa, Fukushima)

Latvia

Memorial complex at Rumbula
Memorial complex at Salaspils
Museum of Tolerance at the site of Kaiserwald
Museum "Jews in Latvia"
Riga ghetto and holocaust in Latvia museum

Lithuania
 Holocaust Exhibition at the Vilna Gaon Jewish State Museum (Vilnius)
 Ponary Massacre Memorial (Paneriai)
 Holocaust Memorial in (Šeduva)
 Ninth Fort Museum (Kaunas)
 Sugihara House (Kaunas)
 The Green House Holocaust Museum (Vilnius)

Luxembourg 

 Memorial to the victims of the Shoah (Luxembourg City)

Mexico
 The Tuvia Maizel Holocaust Museum, (Mexico City)

Netherlands
 The Anne Frank House (Amsterdam)
 The Hollandsche Schouwburg (Amsterdam)
 The Joods Historisch Museum (Amsterdam)
 Joods Monument (memorial website)
 The Homomonument (Amsterdam)
 The Dock Worker Monument
 The Westerbork camp and information centre (Westerbork)
 Camp Vught National Memorial at Herzogenbusch concentration camp
 Holocaust Namenmonument (National Holocaust Names Memorial) in Jodenbuurt Neighborhood of Amsterdam

New Zealand
 The Holocaust Centre of New Zealand (HCNZ)

North Macedonia
 Holocaust Memorial Center for the Jews of Macedonia (Skopje)

Norway
 Center for Studies of Holocaust and Religious Minorities (Oslo)

Philippines
Philippine–Israel Friendship Park (Quezon City)

Poland
 The Monument to the Ghetto Heroes, Warsaw.
 Auschwitz-Birkenau State Museum, (Oświęcim)
 The Oświęcim Synagogue (Oświęcim)
 Bełżec extermination camp (Bełżec)
 Ghetto Heroes Monument (Warsaw)
 POLIN Museum of the History of Polish Jews, (Warsaw)
 Warsaw Ghetto Museum (Warsaw)
 Eagle Pharmacy, (Kraków)
 Lublin Holocaust Memorial
 Radegast train station (Łódź)
 Survivors' Park, (Łódź)
 Treblinka extermination camp, Treblinka
 Monument to the Memory of Children - Victims of the Holocaust
 Umschlagplatz Monument, Warsaw
 Memorial in Palmiry
 Museum and Memorial in Sobibór

Portugal 
 Holocaust Museum of Oporto

Romania
  Holocaust Memorial, Bucharest.
 Elie Wiesel Memorial House, Sighetu Marmației
 Memorial to the Victims of the 1941 Pogrom, Bucharest
 Holocaust Memorial, Târgu Mures
 Northern Transylvania Holocaust Memorial Museum, Şimleu Silvaniei.
 Memorial to the Deported Jews, Oradea.

Russia

 Holocaust Memorial Synagogue, Moscow.
 Russian Research and Educational Holocaust Center, Moscow.
 Formula of Sorrow monument, Pushkin, Saint Petersburg.
 Memorial plaque to Jewish deportees from Königsberg and East Prussia, Kaliningrad North Railway Station.
 Memorial to the Victims of Fascism, Krasnodar.
 Mass murder site monument, Lyubavichi.
 Ravine of Death memorial stone, Taganrog.
 Palmnicken massacre monument, Yantarny, Kaliningrad.
 Monument at Vostryakovo Jewish Cemetery, Moscow.
 Zmievskaya Balka memorial, Rostov-on-Don.

Serbia

 Menorah in Flames sculpture (Belgrade)
 Memorial Park Jajinci (Belgrade)
 Banjica concentration camp (Belgrade)
 Jewish Historical Museum (Belgrade)
 Belgrade Museum of Genocide Victims
 Miklós Radnóti memorial (Bor)
 Kladovo transport memorial
 Šumarice Genocide Memorial Park (Kragujevac)
 Monument to the victims of the Novi Sad raid
 Bubanj Memorial Park (Niš)
 Crveni Krst concentration camp (Niš)

Slovakia

 Memorial at the Museum of the Slovak National Uprising (Banská Bystrica)
 Holocaust Memorial (Bratislava)
 Museum of Jewish Culture (Bratislava)
 Holocaust memorial for the Jewish inhabitants of Huncovce
 Holocaust memorial plaque on the synagogue of Košice

 Monument and Memorial to the Slovak National Uprising (Nemecká)
 Memorial to the Victims of the Nováky Forced Labor and Concentration Camp
 Memorial Plaque to the Deported Jews at Poprad Railway Station
 Holocaust Memorial at Prešov synagogue
 Holocaust memorial plaque Prešov town hall
 Sereď Holocaust Museum
Park of Generous Souls

Slovenia
 Loibl Süd Concentration Camp Memorial

South Africa

 The Cape Town Holocaust Centre (Cape Town)
 The Durban Holocaust Centre (Durban)
 The Johannesburg Holocaust And Genocide Centre (Johannesburg)
 Memorial to the Six Million at Westpark Cemetery (Johannesburg)

Spain
 Monument to the Victims of the Holocaust (Madrid)
 Monument to the Victims of the Mauthausen Concentration Camp (Almería)

Suriname

 Paramaribo Holocaust Memorial Paramaribo

Sweden
 Monument to the Memory of the Holocaust Victims at the Great Synagogue of Stockholm (Stockholm)
 Storsjöteatern theatre (Östersund)

Taiwan 
 Holocaust Museum, Taiwan.

Ukraine
 "Wailing Wall" for the murdered Jews of Bakhmut
 Memorial to the murdered Jews of Chernihiv
 Memorial to the Roma murdered in the Podusovka forest, near Chernihiv
 Babi Yar Holocaust Memorial Center, Kiev
 Memorial to the murdered Jews of Kovel at the Bakhiv forest mass murder site.
 Memorial to the murdered Jews of Kysylyn at the mass grave site
 Memorials to the murdered Jews of Lutsk
 Memorial to the murdered Jews of Mariupol
 Memorial to the Jews of Mukachevo
 Holocaust Museum in Odessa
 Memorial to the murdered Jews of Ostrozhets
 Memorial to the murdered Jews of Pryluky
 Memorial to the murdered Jews of Ratne at the mass graves site
 Memorial site for the murdered Jews of Ostrozhets
 Memorial to the murdered Jews of Rava-Ruska
 Memorial to the Murdered Jews of Zhytomyr

United Kingdom

 Beth Shalom Holocaust Centre (National Holocaust Centre and Museum), Nottingham
 Church of St Michael the Greater, Stamford, Lincolnshire
 Holocaust Centre North, Huddersfield
 Hyde Park Holocaust Memorial, Hyde Park, London
 Holocaust Exhibition, Imperial War Museum, London
 Wiener Library for the Study of the Holocaust and Genocide, London
 (Proposed) UK Holocaust Memorial, London

United States

Uruguay
 Memorial del Holocausto del Pueblo Judío (Montevideo)

Uzbekistan
Victory Park, [Tashkent] monument unveiled in May 2022 to honour Uzbeks who assisted Jewish refugees during World War II. It is sculpted by Victory Park. It was created by Uzbeki [Marina Borodina].

The monument is located in the city’s Victory Park

See also

Notes

References

Further reading

External links 

 Holocaust Memorials — by continents and countries
 Information Portal to European Sites of Remembrance 
 Global Directory of Holocaust Museums
 Holocaust Memorial Monuments — digital database
 Memorial sites for Sinti and Roma (in German) 
 Remembering the Holocaust 24 Hour Museum
 Monuments and Memorials — historical overview 
 National Holocaust Memorials — comparison

Holocaust
Holocaust
Memorials and museums